Baffour is both a surname and a given name by the Ashanti people from Ghana. Notable people with the name include:

Surname:
Emmanuel Baffour (born 1989), Ghanaian footballer
Fritz Baffour (born 1952), Ghanaian journalist, politician and communications consultant
R. P. Baffour, Ghanaian academic

Given name:
Baffour Gyan (born 1980), Ghanaian professional footballer
Baffour Kyei (born 1989), Ghanaian professional footballer